Makoko is an informal settlement across the 3rd Mainland Bridge located on the coast of mainland Lagos. A third of the community is built on stilts along the lagoon and the rest is on the land. The waterfront part of the community is largely harboured by the Egun people who migrated from Badagary and Republic of Benin and whose main occupation is fishing.

Makoko is sometimes referred to as the "Venice of Africa" owing to its waterways. Its population is considered to be 85,840; however, the area was not officially counted as part of the 2007 census and the population has been estimated to be much higher. In July 2012, the Lagos State government ordered that some of the stilts beyond the power-lines be brought down without proper notice. This led to the destruction of several stilts on the Iwaya/Makoko waterfront and many families were rendered homeless.

History 
Established in the 19th century, much of Makoko rests in structures constructed on stilts above Lagos Lagoon. Makoko is a neighbouring community to Iwaya on the waterfront and Oko Baba.

The name Makoko is literally translated from Yoruba to be "Pick Akoko". In Yoruba tradition "Akoko" leaves are used to aid fertility and also used during Chieftaincy coronation, present day Makoko had the leaf growing in abundance.

In July 2012, Lagos State government under the governorship of Babatunde Fashola ordered that the stilts on the Iwaya/Makoko waterfront be demolished and dozens of stilts were demolished  within 72 hours of notice to the residents. Nearly 3,000 people lost their homes to the demolition  exercise.
Two months after the partial demolition, a Serac housing affiliate known as the Urban Spaces Innovation developed a regeneration plan for Makoko that would bring the community together with academics, non-profits, and international consultants. The plan was submitted to the Lagos State Ministry of Urban and Physical Planning in January 2014.

Gallery

See also 
 Makoko Floating School
 CEE HOPE
 Ganvie

References

External links 

 (Photos of Makoko)
 Lagos' floating slum Makoko - what's it like to live there?
 Makoko：The "Floating Town" of Lagos, Nigeria：An entire town on stilts

Slums in Nigeria
Fishing communities in Nigeria
18th-century establishments in Lagos
Squats